Skånes köpmannablad ('Merchants Newspaper of Skåne') was a weekly newspaper published in Malmö, Sweden, between 1919 and 1935. 

The newspaper was the organ of the Merchants League of Skåne. Albin Bolmstedt was the editor of the publication from 1920 to 1935. The newspaper was closed down as Bolmstedt launched a new publication in 1936, Handelsbladet.

References

1919 establishments in Sweden
1935 disestablishments in Sweden
Defunct newspapers published in Sweden
Defunct weekly newspapers
Mass media in Malmö
Newspapers established in 1919
Publications disestablished in 1935
Swedish-language newspapers
Weekly newspapers published in Sweden